Sher Bahadur Tamang is a Nepalese politician and was Minister of Health and Population of Government of Nepal. He also served as a Minister of Law, Justice and Parliamentary Affairs under First Oli cabinet. He is a member of the Federal Parliament of Nepal. He won the Sindhupalchowk–2 seat in Nepalese legislative elections of 2017 as part of the Communist Party of Nepal (Unified Marxist–Leninist).

In July 2018, Tamang gave a controversial remark about female Nepali students studying for their MBBS in Bangladesh, stating they were "bound to compromise their honour to claim their certificates." He publicly apologized, but after facing pressure from his party, resigned from his post.

Political appointments and elections 
In 2040 BS, Tamang became the District Committee Chairperson of ANNFSU, a student organization of CPN UML. In 2054 BS, he became the District Committee Secretary of CPN UML, and in 2059 BS, he was a member of Bagmati Zonal of CPN UML. He was elected as a member of the Constituent Assembly from Sindhupalchowk-3 in 2nd Nepalese Constituent Assembly and elected as a member of the House of Representatives from Sindhupalchok-2 in 2074 BS.

See also
Ministry of Health and Population (Nepal)

References

Communist Party of Nepal (Unified Marxist–Leninist) politicians
Living people
Nepal MPs 2017–2022
Nepal Communist Party (NCP) politicians
1969 births
Tamang people
Members of the 2nd Nepalese Constituent Assembly